Gasman is a 15-minute short film written and directed by Lynne Ramsay. Released in 1998, Set in the 1970s it stars Ramsay's niece and namesake Lynne Ramsay Jr. as Lynne, a young girl who discovers her father's not-so-secret infidelity at a Christmas party. The film is filmed and set in Glasgow. The film received critical attention and premiered at the 1998 Cannes Film Festival where it received the Short Film Palme d'Or. It also received the BAFTA Award for Best Short Film nomination.

The film is available on the Cinema 16: World Short Films and Cinema 16: European Short Films (US Special Edition) DVDs, and as a bonus feature on the Ratcatcher DVD in the UK and the US.

Plot 
Set in the 1970s it stars Ramsay's niece and namesake Lynne Ramsay Jr. as Lynne, a young girl who discovers her father's not-so-secret infidelity at a Christmas party. The film is filmed and set in Glasgow.

Cast 
Lynne Ramsay Jr. as Lynne
Martin Anderson as Steven
James Ramsay as Da
Denise Flannagan as Ma
Jackie Quinn as Woman
Lisa Taylor as Girl
Robert McEwan as Boy

Release 
The film is available on the Cinema 16: World Short Films and Cinema 16: European Short Films (US Special Edition) DVDs
This short film is featured on the Criterion Collection DVD for Ratcatcher (1999).

Awards and nominations

References

External links 

 

1998 short films
British short films